Julius "Jules" de Corte (29 March 1924 – 16 February 1996) was probably one of the most famous blind singer-songwriters from the Netherlands.

Early life 
Julius de Corte was born on 29 March 1924 in Deurne to Peer de Corte and Anna van Eijk. His father had socialist ideals and in 1923 led a strike, the failure of which had a significant impact on the already poor family. At fourteen months, Jules developed a middle ear infection, which eventually led to him becoming blind. He would spend the rest of his childhood in two Catholic institutions for the blind in Grave, which provided him with a good education but no affection. In the last year of the Second World War, allied soldiers were accommodated in the institute and De Corte sang songs for them and played the piano.

Music career 
In 1945 De Corte became a professional musician. Initially he played at dance schools and parties and so on, but soon afterwards he began to make radio and stage appearances. Over the years, he collaborated with many other famous performers, including Louis van Dijk, Albert Mol and Rita Reys.

It is estimated he wrote over 3,000 songs, some poetic and sad, others funny.

De Corte died on 16 February 1996 in Eindhoven.

Discography

Prizes 
De Corte received the following prizes:
 Edison Award (1962), for the album Liedjes die eigenlijk niet mogen
 Visser-Neerlandia Prize (1967), for his complete works
 Golden Harp (1969)
 Louis Davids Prize (1975), for the song Het land van de toekomst

References

External links 
 
 

1924 births
1996 deaths
Blind musicians
Dutch musicians
People from Deurne, Netherlands
Dureco artists